Marie Olaussen (born 1997) is a Norwegian orienteering competitor who runs for the club Fredrikstad SK.

She represented Norway at the 2021 World Orienteering Championships in the Czech Republic, where she placed 11th in the middle distance. She won a bronze medal in the relay with the Norwegian team, along with Kamilla Steiwer and Andrine Benjaminsen.

References

1997 births
Living people
Norwegian orienteers
Female orienteers
Foot orienteers
21st-century Norwegian women
Junior World Orienteering Championships medalists